was a Japanese businessman, central banker, the 26th Governor of the Bank of Japan (BOJ) and a Director of the Bank for International Settlements (BIS).

Early life
Mieno was born in Ōita.

Career
From April 1975 through February 1978, Mieno was head of the BOJ banking department.

Mieno was BOJ Governor from December 17, 1989, to December 16, 1994, having previously served as Deputy Governor from 1984 to 1989. Starting  a week after his appointment, from late December 1989 until August 1990, BOJ heavily increased interest rates. Soon the Japanese asset price bubble of the 1980s collapsed.

In 1994, he was an elected member of the BIS Board of Directors.

On April 15, 2012, Mieno died from heart failure in a Tokyo hospital.

Selected works
In a statistical overview derived from writings by and about Yasushi Mieno, OCLC/WorldCat encompasses roughly 7 works in 10 publications in 2 languages and 50+ library holdings.

 World Economy in the 1990s: a Japanese Central Banker's View (1990)
 Current Monetary and Economic Conditions in Japan (1993)
  (1995)
  (2000)

Notes

References
 Werner, Richard A. (2003). Princes of the Yen: Japan's Central Bankers and the Transformation of the Economy. Armonk, New York: M.E. Sharpe. ;  OCLC 471605161

1924 births
2012 deaths
Governors of the Bank of Japan
People from Ōita Prefecture